Cariboo—Prince George is a federal electoral district in the province of British Columbia, Canada, that has been represented in the House of Commons of Canada since 2004.

Geography
The riding of Cariboo—Prince George extends from near Williams Lake in the south to Prince George in the north and Vanderhoof in the west. Cities and towns in this area include Williams Lake, Quesnel, Wells, Prince George & Vanderhoof. Voters in the Vanderhoof and Prince George tend to vote more Conservative while voters in the Cariboo (Quesnel, Williams Lake) tend to lean towards the NDP.

History
This district was created in 2003 from parts of Cariboo—Chilcotin and Prince George—Bulkley Valley ridings.

The 2012 federal electoral boundaries redistribution concluded that the electoral boundaries of Cariboo—Prince George should be adjusted slightly, and a modified electoral district of the same name will be contested in future elections. The redefined Cariboo—Prince George lost a small portion of its current territory in the upper Bella Coola Valley to the district of Skeena—Bulkley Valley but is otherwise unchanged. These new boundaries were legally defined in the 2013 representation order, came into effect upon the call of the 42nd Canadian federal election, scheduled for October 2015.

Demographics

Members of Parliament

Election results

See also
 List of Canadian federal electoral districts
 Past Canadian electoral districts

Notes

References

 Library of Parliament Riding Profile
 Expenditures – 2004

Notes

External links
 Website of the Parliament of Canada

British Columbia federal electoral districts
Politics of Prince George, British Columbia